The 2018–19 Savannah State Tigers basketball team represented Savannah State University during the 2018–19 NCAA Division I men's basketball season. The Tigers, led by 14th-year head coach Horace Broadnax, played their home games at Tiger Arena in Savannah, Georgia as members of the Mid-Eastern Athletic Conference. They finished the season 11-20 overall, 8-8 in MEAC play to finish in seventh place. As the No. 7 seed in the MEAC tournament they lost in the first round to No. 11 seed Delaware State.

This season marks the Tigers' final season playing in Division I as they will rejoin Division II after the season.

Previous season
With a win over South Carolina State on March 1, 2018, the Tigers earned a share of the MEAC regular season championship.  They finished the season 15–17, 12–4 in MEAC play, finishing in a three-way tie for first place. Due to tie-breaking procedures, the Tigers received the No. 3 seed in the MEAC tournament, where they lost to North Carolina Central in the quarterfinals. The Tigers were initially ruled to be ineligible for postseason play for a second consecutive season due to APR violations. However, the NCAA granted the Tigers a waiver allowed them to participate in postseason play.

Roster

Schedule and results

|-
!colspan=9 style=| Exhibition 

|-
!colspan=9 style=| Non-conference regular season

|-
!colspan=9 style=| MEAC regular season

|-
!colspan=9 style=| MEAC tournament

References

Savannah State Tigers basketball seasons
Savannah State
Savannah State Tigers basketball team
Savannah State Tigers basketball team